Simyra dentinosa is a moth of the family Noctuidae. It is found in south-eastern 
Caspian, Balkans, southern part of Eastern Europe, the Near East and Middle East. It has been introduced in the United States.

Adults are on wing from January to March. There is one generation per year.

The larvae feed on Euphorbia species.

External links
Images
The Acronictinae, Bryophilinae, Hypenodinae and Hypeninae of Israel

Simyra (moth)
Moths of Europe
Moths of Asia
Moths of the Middle East
Moths described in 1838